= William de Groat =

American bioscientist

William de Groat is an American bioscientist, focusing in neuropharmacology and pharmacology of cell and nervous systems, currently Distinguished Professor at University of Pittsburgh.
